Merseburg is a town in central Germany in southern Saxony-Anhalt, situated on the river Saale, and approximately 14 km south of Halle (Saale) and 30 km west of Leipzig. It is the capital of the Saalekreis district. It had a diocese founded by Archbishop Adalbert of Magdeburg.
The University of Merseburg is located within the town. Merseburg has around 33,000 inhabitants.

Names

Geography

The town Merseburg consists of Merseburg proper and the following four Ortschaften or municipal divisions:
Beuna (Geiseltal)
Geusa
Meuschau
Trebnitz

Administrative reforms 
Venenien was incorporated into Merseburg on 1 January 1949. The parish Kötzschen followed on 1 July 1950. Since 30 May 1994, Meuschau is part of Merseburg. Trebnitz, previously part of Kreypau, followed in 2003. Beuna was annexed on 1 January 2009. Geusa is a part of Merseburg since 1 January 2010.

History

Pre-history and Middle Ages
Merseburg was first mentioned in 850. King Henry the Fowler built a royal palace at Merseburg; in the 933 Battle of Riade, he gained his great victory over the Hungarians in the vicinity.

Thietmar, appointed in 973, became the first bishop of the newly created bishopric of Prague in Bohemia. Prague had been part of the archbishopric of Mainz for a hundred years before that. From 968 until the Protestant Reformation, Merseburg was the seat of the Bishop of Merseburg, and in addition to being for a time the residence of the margraves of Meissen, it was a favorite residence of the German kings during the 10th, 11th and 12th centuries. Fifteen diets were held here during the Middle Ages, during which time its fairs enjoyed the importance which was afterwards transferred to those of Leipzig. After Ekkehard's treacherous death on April 3, 1002, Bolesław I Chrobry took Merseburg and Meissen, and then Milsko with Bautzen and Strehla, with the help of the local Slavic population. The German princes accepted the sovereignty of the Polish prince in these areas. Some historians believe that since the convention in Gniezno, the Brave might have had certain rights to the German throne after Otto III, guaranteed by some succession document. Merseburg was later the site of a failed assassination attempt on Polish ruler Bolesław I Chrobry in 1002. The town suffered severely during the German Peasants' War and also during the Thirty Years' War.

17th century to 20th century
From 1657 to 1738 Merseburg was the residence of the Dukes of Saxe-Merseburg, after which it fell to the Electorate of Saxony. In 1815 following the Napoleonic Wars, the town became part of the Prussian Province of Saxony.

Merseburg is where the Merseburg Incantations were rediscovered in 1841. Written down in Old High German, they are hitherto the only preserved German documents with a heathen theme. One of them is a charm to release warriors caught during battle, and the other is a charm to heal a horse's sprained foot.

At the beginning of the 20th century, Merseburg was transformed into an industrial town, largely due to the pioneering work done by Carl Bosch and Friedrich Bergius, who laid down the scientific fundamentals of the catalytic high-pressure ammonia synthesis from 1909 to 1913. The nearby Leuna works continue this tradition of chemical industry.

Merseburg was badly damaged in World War II. In 23 air raids, 6,200 dwellings were completely or partly destroyed. The historic town centre was almost completely destroyed.

Briefly part of Saxony-Anhalt after the war, it was then administered within the Bezirk Halle in East Germany. It became part of Saxony-Anhalt again after the reunification of Germany.

Demographics
Like many towns in the former East Germany, Merseburg has had a general decline in population since German Reunification despite annexing and merging with a number of smaller nearby villages.

Population of Merseburg (from 1960, population on 31 December, unless otherwise indicated):

Data source from 1990: Statistical Office of Saxony Anhalt
1 29 October
2 31 August
3 3 October
4 14 July 2008

Sights
Among the notable buildings of Merseburg are the Merseburg Cathedral of St John the Baptist (founded 1015, rebuilt in the 13th and 16th centuries) and the episcopal palace (15th century). The cathedral-and-palace ensemble also features a palace garden.

Other sights include the Merseburg House of Trades with a cultural stage and the German Museum of Chemistry, Merseburg.

Arts and culture
The Merseburg Palace Festival with the Historical Pageant, the International Palace-Moat Concerts, Merseburg Organ Days and the Puppet Show Festival Week are events celebrated every year.

Transport
Merseburg station is located on the Halle–Bebra railway. Leipzig/Halle Airport is just 25 kilometers away.
Merseburg is connected with the Halle (Saale) tramway network. A tram ride from Halle's city centre to Merseburg takes about 50 minutes.

Twin towns – sister cities

Merseburg is twinned with:
 Châtillon, France
 Genzano di Roma, Italy
 Bottrop, Germany

Notable people

Thietmar of Merseburg (975–1018), bishop and chronist
Johannes Knolleisen (1450–1513), theological professor
Szymon Bogumił Zug (1733–1807), Polish-German architect and designer of gardens
Karl Adolph von Basedow (1799–1854), physician
Ernst Haeckel (1834–1919), biologist, philosopher, physician
Lucian Müller (1836–1898), classical scholar
Elisabeth Schumann (1888–1952), operatic soprano
Klaus Tennstedt (1926–1998), conductor
Uwe Nolte (born 1969), poet, musician and graphic artist
Jawed Karim (born 1979), American software engineer, YouTube co-founder, creator of the first video uploaded to YouTube "Me at the zoo"

References

External links

 

 
Saalekreis
Members of the Hanseatic League